Admiral (Ret.) Tedjo Edhy Purdijatno (born September 20, 1952) is an Indonesian politician and retired Naval officer. He was the Coordinating Minister for Political, Legal and Security Affairs of the Republic of Indonesia from October 27, 2014, to August 12, 2015. Tedjo was also the Chief of Staff of the Navy from 2008 to 2009.

Education
Tedjo completed his military training at the Indonesian Naval Academy in 1975. He also obtained a law degree from Hang Tuah University, Surabaya in 2001. He also attend numerous military education namely Indonesian Navy Staff and Command School, Indonesian Armed Forces Staff and Command School, National Defence Institution, National Resilience Institute Course batch 34.

Personal life
Tedjo was born in Magelang, Central Java on September 20, 1952. He is married with 4 children.

Military career 
Tedjo has served for 35 years in Indonesian Navy. He served in numerous branch of the Indonesian Navy including the Naval Aviation Unit as Fixed wing Naval Aviator, he also serve as the commanding officer of KRI Teluk Lampung (540), KRI Teluk Semangka (512) and KRI Multatuli (561).

Tedjo served in various branches of the Indonesian Navy namely 
 Commander of the Amphibious unit of the Indonesian Navy Eastern Fleet Command 
 Commander of the Western Fleet's Marine Security Group of the Indonesian Navy Western Fleet Command 
 Chief of Staff Indonesian Navy Eastern Fleet Command 
 Deputy Commander of the Indonesian Navy Staff and Command School 
 Commander of the Indonesian Navy Western Fleet Command  
 Planning Assistant to the Chief of Staff of the Indonesian Navy
 Chief of Staff of the Indonesian Navy

He was also served in various branches of the Indonesian National Armed Forces and Ministry of Defence of the Republic of Indonesia, namely
 Director General of Defence Planning of the Ministry of Defense (Indonesia)
 Commander of the Indonesian National Armed Forces Staff and Command School 
 Chief of General Staff of the Indonesian National Armed Forces

He was inaugurated as Chief of Staff of the Navy on July 1, 2008, by the President Susilo Bambang Yudhoyono , replacing Admiral Sumardjono who is retired.

Admiral Tedjo Edhy Purdijatno was officially replaced by Admiral Agus Suhartono on November 13, 2009.

On October 27, 2014, he was appointed to serve in President Joko Widodo Working Cabinet (2014–2019) as Coordinating Minister for Political, Legal and Security Affairs of the Republic of Indonesia.

Honours, decorations, awards and distinctions

Foreign Honours, decorations, awards and distinctions
 Singapore: 40px Pingat Jasa Gemilang 
 Malaysia: 40px Panglima Gagah Angkatan Tentera (Kehormatan) 
 Thailand: 40px Grand Cross Knight to the Order of Crown of Thailand (First Class)

Notes and references

|-

|-

|-

|-

|-

1952 births
Living people
Indonesian politicians
People from Magelang Regency